Richard Lyng was Archdeacon of Suffolk between 3 and 27 May 1347 and then Archdeacon of Sudbury between 1348 and 1366.

References

Year of birth missing
Year of death missing
14th-century English Roman Catholic priests
People from Sudbury, Suffolk
Archdeacons of Suffolk